This is a list of ICC Men's T20 World Cup records that have been broken over the tournaments of the ICC Men's T20 World Cup.

Notation
Team notation
 (200–3) indicates that a team scored 200 runs for three wickets and the innings was closed, either due to a successful run chase or if no overs remained (or are able) to be bowled.
 (200) indicates that a team scored 200 runs and was all out, either by losing all ten wickets or by having one or more batsmen unable to bat and losing the remaining wickets.

Batting notation
 (50) indicates that a batsman scored 50 runs and was out.
 (50*) indicates that a batsman scored 50 runs and was not out.

Bowling notation
 (5–50) indicates that a bowler has captured five wickets while giving away 50 runs.

Currently playing
 Record holders who are currently playing T20Is or streaks that are still active and can change have a ^ next to their name.

Team records

Team wins, losses, ties, and no results

Result records

Greatest win margin (by runs)

Greatest win margin (by wickets)

Lowest win margin (by runs)

Team scoring records

Highest innings totals

Lowest innings totals

Highest match aggregate

Lowest match aggregate

Highest run chase

Most extras conceded in one innings
An extra is a run scored by a means other than a batsman hitting the ball. Other than runs scored off the bat from a no-ball, a batsman is not given credit for extras and the extras are tallied separately on the scorecard and count only towards the team's score.

Individual records

Batting

Most runs

Most runs in each batting position

Highest individual scores

Highest average

Highest strike rate

Most centuries

Most 50+ scores

Fastest 50

Fastest 100

Most sixes

Most fours

Most sixes in an innings

Most fours in an innings

Most runs through boundaries in an innings

Most ducks

One tournament

Most runs in a tournament

Most 50+ scores in a tournament

More record holders

Bowling

Most career wickets

Best bowling figures

Best average

Best strike rate

Best economy rate

Most four-wicket hauls (and over)

Most wickets in a tournament

Hat-tricks

Fielding
While records for best fielders have varied through World Cups, the records for wicket keepers have been occupied by MS Dhoni who holds the record for most dismissals overall and AB De Villiers which holds the record for most dismissals by a wicket keeper in one tournament.

Most dismissals (wicketkeeper)

Most catches (fielder)

One tournament

One match

Appearances

Tournaments

Most Matches Played

Representing more than one country

Most T20 World Cup Titles

Age

Most matches as a captain

Most player-of-the-match awards

Partnership

Highest overall partnership runs by a pair

Highest partnerships (any wicket)

Other Records

Grounds
The World Cup has never been held in same country twice.

Umpires

Other Results

General statistics by tournament

Results of host teams

Results of defending champions

See also
 List of Cricket World Cup records
 List of Twenty20 International records

References

External links

Statistics and records
Cricket records and statistics
Records